Palacio de los Gosálvez is a palace in Villalgordo del Júcar in the Province of Albacete, Spain. It was built in 1902 by Enrique Gosálvez.

References

Buildings and structures in the Province of Albacete
Houses completed in 1902
Palaces in Castilla–La Mancha